was a Japanese actor. His birth name was Ishikawa Yoshiaki. He was born in Tokyo.

Mizuki made his acting debut in 1958, in Futeki naru hanko which was directed by Makino Masahiro. He played a number of juvenile delinquent-type roles in TV series in the late fifties and early sixties.

In 1964, he appeared in the internationally released Fuji TV action television series Ninja butai gekkô, known as Phantom Agents in the English language release. Joh Mizuki played the lead role of Phantar, who was the leader of a band of ninja-skilled government agents. Phantom Agents was shown in Australia, Venezuela, Brazil and other countries, including a limited airing in America in the New York area.

References

Nikki White's 'Phantom Agents' page at Ensovaari Embassy website

External links
忍者部隊月光 (Ninja Butai Gekkō) in the Japanese Wikipedia

People from Tokyo
1938 births
1991 deaths
20th-century Japanese male actors